The second season of the police procedural drama RIS Delitti Imperfetti was originally broadcast between January 9 and February 20, 2006 on Canale 5.

Plot 
A new arrival in the RIS: it is Lieutenant Giorgia Levi, a criminologist psychologist hired to trace a psychological profile of the serial bomber. Meanwhile, the Bomb Man aims higher and higher: he kills Lieutenant Anna Giordano, poisoning her with a bracelet. The desperation of Captain Riccardo Venturi, who was having an affair with the girl, and the determination of the RIS men lead to the arrest of the serial killer, who however denies involvement in the murders. But the truth is burning: the arrested is not the Bomb Man, but his twin brother; the two had been separated at birth and neither knew of the other's existence. The hunt for the Bomb Man ends, or so it seems, at Borgo Val di Taro, on top of a dam from which the Bomb Man throws himself. But the body is not found: Venturi cannot believe in the man's death and stubbornly throws himself in search of him, even ending up on leave. Eventually, however, the captain manages to prove that the Bomb Man is alive and that he was saved via a special silicone vest.. Back on duty, the captain resumes the hunt for the bomb, which culminates in a violent firefight, where the twin of the serial killer is killed and Venturi himself is wounded. Relieved of his post, he will still manage to foil the latest attack and capture the Bomb Man. Naturally, around the central plot revolve sub-plots that speak of crimes, rape, serial murders, satanic crimes, suicides, robberies and kidnappings. In this season, particular space will be given to the character of Venturi and in one episode he will also discover himself atheist (The Last Greeting). In the meantime, Martinelli's struggle against the factory that made his father sick continues and a love is born between Martinelli himself and the new arrival Giorgia Levi. The story between Davide and Francesca De Biase ends when she decides to go and take care of her legs and study in the United States.

Cast

Main 
Lorenzo Flaherty as Captain Riccardo Venturi
Nicole Grimaudo as Lieutenant Anna Giordano (episodes 1-4)
Filippo Nigro as Lieutenant Fabio Martinelli
Stefano Pesce as Lieutenant Davide Testi
Ugo Dighero as Sergeant Vincenco De Biase
Gea Lionello as Dr. Claudia Morandi, ME
Paolo Maria Scalondro as Captain Eduardo Rocchi
Leonardo Treviglio as Luca Grassi
Romina Mondello as Lieutenant Giorgia Levi

Recurring 
Giulia Michelini as Francesca De Biase (episodes 3, 10 & 15)
Nino D' Agata as General Giacomo Tosi (episodes 1, 3-5, 11-14)

Episodes

References 

2006 American television seasons